Steve Orcherton (born 1952) is a Canadian politician, who represented the electoral district of Victoria-Hillside in the Legislative Assembly of British Columbia from 1996 to 2001. He sat as a member of the New Democratic Party.

He was defeated in the 2001 provincial election by Sheila Orr, the same candidate he had faced in the 1996 provincial election. In the 2005 provincial election, Orcherton again sought the New Democratic Party nomination in Victoria-Hillside, but lost to Rob Fleming, who defeated Orr in the general election.

Electoral record

References

External links
 Profile at the Legislative Assembly of British Columbia

British Columbia New Democratic Party MLAs
Living people
Politicians from Victoria, British Columbia
Year of birth uncertain
1952 births